Ytterhorn is a Norwegian surname. Notable people with the surname include:

 Bjørn Erling Ytterhorn (1923–1987), Norwegian politician 
 Inger-Marie Ytterhorn (1941–2021), Norwegian politician

Norwegian-language surnames